Joseph John Holliday, (born 26 September 1958) is a former Gibraltarian politician and member of the Gibraltar Social Democrats. He served as Gibraltar's Minister for Tourism and Deputy Chief Minister and Minister for Trade and Enterprise with responsibility for economic development until the 2011 general election, with Peter Caruana as Chief Minister. Holliday failed to obtain a seat at the Gibraltar Parliament at this election. He was also chairman of Gibtelecom, AquaGib and Gibraltar Electricity Authority. He was also Chairman of the Development and Planning Commission.

References

Gibraltarian politicians
Government ministers of Gibraltar
Living people
1955 births